Sound the Alarm is the tenth studio album by soul musician Booker T. Jones. It was released in June 2013, and features guest appearances from Gary Clark, Jr., Estelle, Anthony Hamilton and Vintage Trouble. The album marks Jones' return to Stax Records, where he made his name with hits like Green Onions (1962) and his first for the label since Melting Pot in 1971.

Track listing

References

External links 
Sound the Alarm by Booker T. Jones at iTunes.com

Booker T. Jones albums
Stax Records albums
2013 albums
Albums produced by Booker T. Jones
Albums produced by Jimmy Jam and Terry Lewis